"Diamonds on My Neck" is a song by American hip hop recording artist Smitty, released by J Records on July 5, 2005, as his commercial debut single. The song, co-written and produced by American musician Swizz Beatz, was set to be the lead single from Smitty's planned debut album Life of a Troubled Child, which was ultimately shelved. The single was released in 2005 to moderate success, charting at #89 on Billboards Hot R&B/Hip-Hop Songs.

The song samples the hook of "Dangerous MC's", as performed by The Notorious B.I.G. The official remix of the song was released on November 5, 2005 and features verses from fellow American rappers Lil Wayne and Twista. The song's music video was directed by Hype Williams.

Chart position

References

Song recordings produced by Swizz Beatz
Songs written by Swizz Beatz
Music videos directed by Hype Williams
2007 debut singles
2005 songs
J Records singles